is a Japanese manga series written by Inujun and illustrated by Namamugi, based on the Seiyū San-Shimai Team Y unit formed by voice actresses Mikoi Sasaki, Aimi, and Ayasa Itō. It has been serialized in Bushiroad's shōnen manga magazine Monthly Bushiroad since January 2021 and has been collected in three tankōbon volumes. An anime television series adaptation by Drive titled Teppen!!!!!!!!!!!!!!! Laughing 'til You Cry aired from July to September 2022.

Characters

Young Wai-wai 
 is a manzai group that represents Kansai region.

Celebri-Tea 
 is a manzai group that represents Tōkai region.

Akudare Kingdom 
 is a manzai group that represents Kantō region.

Invaders 
 is a manzai group that represents Hokkaido area.

Bullet Kunoichi 
 is a manzai group that represents Kansai area.

Other characters

Media

Manga
The manga series is written by Inujun and illustrated by Namamugi and has been serialized in Bushiroad's shōnen manga magazine Monthly Bushiroad since January 2021. Three tankōbon volumes were released as of July 2022.

Anime

An anime television series adaptation titled Teppen!!!!!!!!!!!!!!! Laughing 'til You Cry was announced on January 6, 2022. The series is produced by Drive and directed by Toshinori Watanabe, with Shinji Takamatsu serving as chief director, Jun Kumagai writing and supervising scripts, Yoshiyuko Ōkubo designing the characters, and Technoboys Pulcraft Green-Fund composing the music. It aired from July 2 to September 24, 2022, on Tokyo MX, CTV, SUN, and HTB. The opening theme song is "Teppen— Tengoku ~TOP OF THE LAUGH!!!~" by Teppen— All Stars, a unit composed of the 15 main cast members, while the ending theme song is "Ahatte Teppen" by May'n. Crunchyroll has licensed the series. The series' second episode was postponed from its original airing following the assassination of Shinzo Abe, and instead aired on September 10, 2022. A special episode funded by Minamishimabara City will be produced if funding is successful.

Notes

References

External links
 
 

Anime series based on manga
Bushiroad
Crunchyroll anime
Shōnen manga
Tokyo MX original programming